Sheeba Records is a Canadian independent record label, owned and operated by Jane Siberry.

Siberry established Sheeba to release her albums following the end of her contract with Reprise Records in 1996. The first album she released on the label was Teenager, a collection of songs she had written in her teenage years but had never released on record.

Since Siberry established Sheeba, she has released all of her albums on the label.

See also 
 List of record labels

External links
 Official site

References

Canadian independent record labels
Record labels established in 1996
Pop record labels
Vanity record labels